Friedrich Jacob Merck (18 February 1621—1678) was a German pharmacist and a member of the Merck family. He was the founder of the world's oldest pharmaceutical company, now known as the Merck Group, which was established in 1668.

Friedrich Jacob Merck was the son of Johann Merck (1573–1642), an innkeeper from Schweinfurt who ran the Zum Schwarzen Bären inn and who was a member of the city council. He did an apprenticeship in the Ratsapotheke in his hometown. He first owned a pharmacy in Wesselburen, before moving to Darmstadt. In 1668 he acquired the second city pharmacy there, the Engel-Apotheke, which became the start of the Merck company.

Friedrich Jacob Merck died in 1678 without any descendants. He had chosen his nephew Georg Friedrich Merck as his successor.

See also
 Merck family

References

External links
 Merck website

Merck Group people
1621 births
1678 deaths
German pharmacists
Scientists from Darmstadt
People from Schweinfurt
Date of death missing
Place of birth missing
Place of death missing
Pharmaceutical company founders